The Zimmerwald Observatory is an astronomical observatory owned and operated by the AIUB, the Astronomical Institute of the University of Bern. Built in 1956, it is located at Zimmerwald, 10 kilometers south of Bern, Switzerland.

Numerous comets and asteroids have been discovered by Paul Wild (1925–2014) at Zimmerwald Observatory, most notably comet 81P/Wild, which was visited by NASA's Stardust space probe in 2004. The main belt asteroid 1775 Zimmerwald has been named after the location of the observatory.

The 1-meter aperture ZIMLAT telescope was inaugurated in 1997.

See also 
 List of largest optical reflecting telescopes
 Swiss Space Office

References

External links 
 Zimmerwald Observatory

Astronomical observatories in Switzerland
Space Situational Awareness Programme